The following is a list of episodes for the Dinosaur King anime series.

Series overview

Episode list

Season 1

Season 2

DVD release

Region 1 (United States/Canada)
The version released on DVD and SDBD is the English dubbed version by 4Kids Entertainment. The DVDs were distributed through Shout Factory.

Announced on 24 September 2018, Discotek Media announced its license and is planning to release the series on two SDBD sets for each season.

External links
 
 Official 4Kids website

Dinosaur King